Mandya Ramesh is an Indian actor, comedian, director and theatre personality who mainly works in the Kannada films and theatre. He is the founder secretary of Natana Rangashaale, Mysore, one of the eminent theatre training institutions of India.

Career
Ramesh started his theatre career in 1982 through a theatre workshop conducted by Ashok Badaradinni, a graduate from National School of Drama. He has worked for Neenasam theatre institute from 1984 as an actor and technician. He then joined Rangayana in 1989 and worked under the guidance of B. V. Karanth for around 9 years. He debuted into acting in films in 1995, with a popular role in the film Janumada Jodi alongside Shiva Rajkumar. In 2002 he founded his own school for theatre arts, Natana which is a prominent theatre institution of India with many working wings. He has also written two books, Rangavalli and Kanavarike that are related to his life in theatre. He has acted in more than 350 films among which Janumada Jodi, Nagamandala, Kanasugara, Mata, Oggarane, Uppina Kagada, Bhajarangi 2, Devara Naadalli,  The Villain, Yajamana are prominent. He has also appeared in TV series like Janani, Manethana,  Chi Sou Savithri, "Shreerasthu Shubhamasthu", "Ivalu Sujatha". The popular plays he has directed include "Oorubhanga", "CHaama Chaluve", "Subhadra Kalyana", "Sayoo Aata", "Mruccha Katika", "Sankranthi" to name a few. He is currently serving as the founder director for Natana School of Theatre arts situated in Mysuru. He also appears as Mandya Muddesha in the popular Kannada sketch comedy show Majaa Talkies, hosted by Srujan Lokesh currently being aired on Colors Kannada channel. He has successfully completed 39 years in theatre and 25 years in Kannada Cinema.

Awards and honours
Karnataka Nataka Academy state award (2017)
 Samskaara Bharathi Natya Samaroha Award: Best Young Theatre Director (1981)
 Karnataka State Film Awards: Best Supporting Actor (Nagamandala, 1996–97)
 Cultural Department, Government of India: Expert Committee Member (2000 - 2003)
 Karnataka Nataka Academy: Member
 Knock Out Award: Best Actor in Supporting Role
 Udaya Film Award: Best Actor in Supporting Role
 K V Shankare Gowda Theatre Award
 Sandesha Award
 Aryabhata Award
 Rangayana: Member of Ranga Samaja (Governing Council)

Filmography

Selected filmography 
 Janumada Jodi
 Nagamandala
 Kanasugara
 Colours
 Amruthadhare
 Maathaad Maathaadu Mallige
 Mussanje Maathu
 Mata
 Gajakesari
 Kalla Malla Sulla
 Oggarane
 Power (2014)
 Melody (2015)
 Ranna (2015)
 Geetha Bangle Store (2015)
 Devara Nadalli (2016)
 Kiragoorina Gayyaligalu (2016)
 Ishtakamya (2016)
 Uppina Kagada (2017)
 The Villain (2018)
 Law (2020)
 Taledanda (2022)

Plays (as Director)
 Mruccha Katika
 Sankranthi
 Maranayaka
 Chora Chandradaasa
 Nagamandala
 Agni Mattu Male
 Sahebru Baruttare
 Yuyuthsu
 Ee Kelaginavaru
 Alibaba
 Neeli Kudure
 Govina Haadu
 Nayi Thippa
 Yugantha
 Vakra
 Ratna Pakshi
 Ailudore
 Chamachaluve
 Samsaradalli Sa Ni Da Pa
 Oorubhanga
 Subhadra Kalyana and many more

References

Living people
Indian male film actors
Indian male television actors
Male actors in Kannada cinema
21st-century Indian male actors
1964 births
People from Mandya district
Male actors from Karnataka
Male actors in Kannada theatre
Indian male stage actors
Male actors in Kannada television
20th-century Indian male actors